100.5 FM may refer to one of many FM radio stations:

Argentina
 FM Córdoba in Córdoba
 del Sol in Pehuajó, Buenos Aires
 Metropolitana in San Miguel de Tucumán, Tucumán
 Ilusiones in Rincón de los Sauces, Neuquén
 Sudamericana in Corrientes
 Xradio in San Clemente del Tuyú, Buenos Aires
 Vida in Buenos Aires
 Urbana in Posadas, Misiones
 San Martín in Lobería, Buenos Aires
 LRJ 717 La voz in San Juan
 El camino in Jujuy
 Traslasierra in Mina Clavero, Córdoba
 Marina in Miramar, Buenos Aires
 FM100 in Sierra Grande, Río Negro
 del este in Chajarí, Entre Ríos
 Los 40 Principales Paraná in Paraná, Entre Ríos
 UTN San Nicolás in San Nicolás de Los Arroyos, Buenos Aires
 Adelia María in Adelia María, Córdoba
 Estudio Net in Casilda, Santa Fe
 Golden 80 in Luján, Buenos Aires
 Disco in San José, Entre Ríos
 Visión in Lamarque, Río Negro
 Chana in Victoria, Entre Ríos
 Minuto 24 in La Rioja
 Color in Buenos Aires

Australia
 2KY in Broken Hill, New South Wales
 2RPH in Sydney, New South Wales
 5WOW in Adelaide, South Australia
 ABC Northern Tasmania in Devonport, Tasmania
 ABC Riverina in Griffith, New South Wales
 CAAMA in Alice Springs, Northern Territory
 Midwest Aboriginal Media Association in Geraldton, Western Australia
 SBS Radio in Dubbo, New South Wales

Belize
My Refuge Christian Radio at Belize City, Belize District

Canada (Channel 263)
 CBBL-FM in London, Ontario
 CBSI-FM-15 in Harrington Harbour, Quebec
 CBSI-FM-6 in Fermont, Quebec
 CBVF-FM in Port-Daniel, Quebec
 CBXM-FM in Manning, Alberta
 CFJL-FM  in Winnipeg, Manitoba
 CFIN-FM in Lac-Etchemin, Quebec
 CFRP-FM in Forestville, Quebec
 CFSR-FM in Hope, British Columbia
 CHAS-FM in Sault Ste. Marie, Ontario
 CHBT-FM in North Battleford, Saskatchewan
 CHFA-8-FM in Medicine Hat, Alberta
 CHFT-FM in Fort McMurray, Alberta
 CHLS-FM in Lillooet, British Columbia
 CHUR-FM in North Bay, Ontario
 CIBO-FM in Senneterre, Quebec
 CIOK-FM in Saint John, New Brunswick
 CJJC-FM in Yorkton, Saskatchewan
 CKJJ-FM-3 in Kingston, Ontario

 CFRO-FM in Vancouver, British Columbia
 CKRU-FM in Peterborough, Ontario
 VF2104 in Chetwynd, British Columbia

 VF2351 in Granisle, British Columbia

Guatemala (Channel 32)
TGN-FM in Guatemala City

Indonesia 
Delta FM in Surabaya, East Java

Malaysia
 Nasional FM in Kedah, Perlis and Penang
 Zayan in Kota Bharu, Kelantan (Coming Soon)

Mexico
XHBCC-FM in Ciudad del Carmen, Campeche
XHBZ-FM in Ciudad Delicias, Chihuahua
XHDCA-FM in Miahuatlán de Porfirio Díaz, Oaxaca
XHFRE-FM in Fresnillo, Zacatecas
XHHD-FM in Durango, Durango
XHIDO-FM in Tula, Hidalgo
XHIMA-FM in Colima, Colima
XHJLAM-FM in Jojutla, Morelos
XHPEAQ-FM in Jiquipilas, Chiapas
XHPMAX-FM in Temax, Yucatán
XHRTO-FM in Felipe Carrillo Puerto, Quintana Roo
XHSCBW-FM in Yuriria, Guanajuato
XHSCFE-FM in Chalco, State of Mexico
XHTLX-FM in Santa María Asunción Tlaxiaco, Oaxaca
XHTNT-FM in Los Mochis, Sinaloa
XHUF-FM in Uruapan, Michoacán
XHVE-FM in Veracruz, Veracruz
XHXR-FM in Ciudad Valles, San Luis Potosí

United Kingdom
 Q Radio in Newry, Northern Ireland
Digital Hits 1 in North Somerset
Heart Devon in Totnes

United States (Channel 263)
  in Oklahoma City, Oklahoma
 KBDR in Mirando City, Texas
  in Anchorage, Alaska
 KBLY in Newcastle, Texas
  in Rexburg, Idaho
 KCGF-LP in San Angelo, Texas
 KDDM in Annona, Texas
 KDHK in Decorah, Iowa
 KEFC-LP in Turlock, California
  in Jonesboro, Arkansas
 KELB-LP in Lake Charles, Louisiana
 KETL-LP in Republic, Washington
 KGHT in El Jebel, Colorado
  in Salem, South Dakota
 KJJM in Baker, Montana
 KJLR-LP in Reno, Nevada
 KLNA-LP in Pittsburg, Texas
 KMEM-FM in Memphis, Missouri
  in Mendota, California
 KMME in Cottage Grove, Oregon
  in East Porterville, California
 KMVL-FM in Madisonville, Texas
 KMXD in Monroe, Utah
 KNNK in Dimmitt, Texas
 KNPI-LP in Padre Island, Texas
 KONA-LP in Kailua-Kona, Hawaii
 KPPZ-LP in Kansas City, Missouri
  in Palm Springs, California
 KPUP-LP in Patagonia, Arizona
 KQBB in Center, Texas
 KQLG-LP in Billings, Montana
  in Troy, Idaho
 KRIK (FM) in Refugio, Texas
  in Durango, Colorado
 KSCK-LP in Sterling City, Texas
 KSGC-LP in Garden City, Kansas
 KSWF in Aurora, Missouri
  in Gualala, California
  in Evansville, Wyoming
 KTFR in Chelsea, Oklahoma
 KTGR-FM in Fulton, Missouri
 KUOZ-LP in Clarksville, Arkansas
 KUPV-LP in Santa Rosa, California
  in Augusta, Kansas
 KWIQ-FM in Moses Lake, Washington
  in Saint James, Minnesota
 KXDZ in Templeton, California
 KXQQ-FM in Henderson, Nevada
 KZDB in Roswell, New Mexico
  in Stamps, Arkansas
 KZRJ-LP in Jerome, Arizona
  in Sacramento, California
 WALC in Charleston, South Carolina
 WAON-LP in Picayune, Mississippi
 WAVL in Rothschild, Wisconsin
  in Batesville, Mississippi
 WBOU-LP in Nashville, Tennessee
  in Susquehanna, Pennsylvania
 WDPI-LP in Palatka, Florida
  in Rochester, New York
  in Ridgeley, West Virginia
 WEBI-LP in Woodlawn, Virginia
 WEEH-LP in Hart, Michigan
 WFCX in Apalachicola, Florida
 WFOI-LP in Fayette, Mississippi
 WGRG-LP in Geneseo, Illinois
  in Newberry, Florida
 WHIC-LP in Carthage, Tennessee
 WHLZ in Marion, South Carolina
 WIAR-LP in Hilton Head Island, South Carolina
 WIML-LP in Lebanon, Tennessee
 WJFN-FM in Goochland, Virginia
 WJLL-LP in Memphis, Tennessee
  in Johnsonburg, Pennsylvania
  in Helena, Alabama
 WJRL-FM in Slocomb, Alabama
  in Huntington, West Virginia
  in Findlay, Ohio
 WNNX in College Park, Georgia
 WOMP in Bellaire, Ohio
 WQBG in Elizabethville, Pennsylvania
 WQSW-LP in Fort Wayne, Indiana
 WRBY-LP in Salisbury, Maryland
 WRCH in New Britain, Connecticut
 WRTM-FM in Sharon, Mississippi
 WRVY-FM in Henry, Illinois
  in Cloquet, Minnesota
 WSDF in Louisville, Kentucky
  in Carrollton, Michigan
 WSJD in Princeton, Indiana
  in Gray Court, South Carolina
 WTLX in Columbus, Wisconsin
  in Walker, Michigan
 WVBW-FM in Norfolk, Virginia
 WVEM-LP in Stanley, North Carolina
 WWKI in Kokomo, Indiana
  in Swainsboro, Georgia
  in Lebanon, New Hampshire
  in Jacksonville, Illinois
 WZQY in Glade Spring, Virginia

References

Lists of radio stations by frequency